This is a list of Bishops and Prince-Bishops of the Diocese of Warmia, which was elevated to the Archdiocese of Warmia in 1992.

The Bishopric was founded in 1243 as the Bishopric of Ermland, one of four bishoprics of Teutonic Prussia. In 1356 it became an Imperial Prince-Bishopric under Emperor Charles IV, and from 1512 until 1930 it was an exempt diocese. From 1947 to 1972 the episcopal see was left vacant following the expulsion of the German population and the Bishop of Ermland from Prussia. The cathedral capitular canons elected capitular vicars for the time sede vacante, recognised by the Holy See.

In 1972 the Holy See installed a new Polish diocese, which in 1992 was elevated to an archdiocese.

Bishops of Ermland / Warmia
1249–1250 Heinrich von Strateich, elected, never actually took office
1250–1274 Anselm of Meissen, first actual bishop to be active in Ermland, from 1253 suffragan of the Archdiocese of Riga
1278–1300 Heinrich Fleming (Henryk Fleming)
1301–1326 Eberhard von Neiße (Nysa, Poland) (Neiße)
1327–1328 Jordan, Bishop of Warmia
1329–1334 Heinrich Wogenap (Wogenap)
1334–1337 sede vacante
1337–1349 Hermann von Prag (Herman z Pragi) (Prague)
1350–1355 Johannes of Meissen

Prince-Bishops of Ermland / Warmia
1355–1373 Johannes Stryprock (Stryprock), designated Prince-Bishop by the Golden Bull
1373–1401 Heinrich Sorbom (Sorbom)
1401–1415 Heinrich Heilsberg von Vogelsang (Vogelsang)
1415–1424 Johannes Abezier
1424–1457 Franz Kuhschmalz (Franciszek Kuhschmalz)
1457–1458 Enea Silvio Piccolomini
1458–1467 Paul von Legendorf (Legendorf)
1467–1489 Nicolaus von Tüngen (Mikołaj Tungen)
1489–1512 Lucas Watzenrode
1512–1523 Fabian of Lossainen, from 1512 de facto exempt, integration into the Archdiocese of Gniezno having failed
1523–1537 Mauritius Ferber
1537–1548 Johannes Dantiscus (Jan Dantyszek, also known as The Father of Polish Diplomacy)
1549–1550 Tiedemann Giese
1551–1579 Stanislaus Hosius, from 1566 de jure exempt with Riga dissolved
1579–1589 Martin Kromer
1589–1599 Andrew Báthory
1600–1604 Piotr Tylicki
1604–1621 Szymon Rudnicki
1621–1633 John Albert Vasa
1633–1643 Mikołaj Szyszkowski
1643–1644 Jan Karol Konopacki
1644–1659 Wacław Leszczyński
1659–1679 Jan Stefan Wydżga
1680–1688 Michał Stefan Radziejowski
1688–1697 Jan Stanisław Zbąski
1698–1711 Andrzej Chryzostom Załuski
1711–1723 Teodor Andrzej Potocki
1724–1740 Christopher Johan Szembek (1680–1740)
1741–1766 Adam Stanisław Grabowski (1698–1766)
1767–1795 Ignacy Krasicki
1795–1803 Karl von Hohenzollern-Hechingen
1803–1808 sede vacante
1808–1836 Joseph von Hohenzollern-Hechingen

Bishops
1836–1841 Andreas Stanislaus von Hatten
1841–1867 Joseph Ambrosius Geritz
1867–1885 Philipp Krementz
1886–1908 Andreas Thiel
1908–1930 Augustinus Bludau
1930–1947 Maximilian Kaller, suffragan of Roman Catholic Archdiocese of Breslau/Wrocław since 1930. Kaller remained bishop until 1947, even though expelled from Warmia in 1946.
1947–1972 sede vacante
1947–1957: Arthur Kather (1883–1957), as vicar capitular; also vicar general for the diocesan area under Soviet rule from 1945 to 1957
1957–1972: Paul Hoppe (1900–1988), as vicar capitular
1972–1978 Józef Drzazga, suffragan of Archdiocese of Warsaw
1979–1981 Józef Glemp
1981–1988 Jan Władysław Obłąk
1988–1992 Edmund Michał Piszcz, elevated as archbishop in 1992

Archbishops
1992–2006 Edmund Michał Piszcz, bishop from 1988
2006–2016 Wojciech Ziemba
 since 2016 Józef Górzyński

See also
Roman Catholic Archdiocese of Warmia
Prince-Bishopric of Warmia

References

External links
 Website of the Archdiocese
Catholic site with information on Archdiocese of Warmia